Regent's Park is a London Underground station  south of Regent's Park. It is on a northern cusp of Fitzrovia and Marylebone on the Bakerloo line, between Baker Street and Oxford Circus. Its access is on Marylebone Road, within Park Crescent, in Travelcard Zone 1, in which zone it is the second-least used station (least-used is Lambeth North) – it saw 3.5 million entries or exits in 2015.

History
The station was opened on 10 March 1906 by the Baker Street and Waterloo Railway (BS&WR); in the original parliamentary authority for the construction of the BS&WR no station was allowed at Regent's Park. Permission was granted to add it to the already partially constructed line in 1904. In 1983, London Transport proposed to close the station on the basis that the passenger lifts, which at the time were 77 years old, needed to be replaced at a cost of more than £3 million. The proposal was dropped following a request by the GLC for the matter to be reconsidered.

Station design
Construction of the station ticket hall involved digging a box like void underneath the garden above. This caused significant subsidence, this is why the large metal beams in the ticket hall are present.

Unlike most of the BS&WR's other stations, Regent's Park has no surface buildings and is accessed from a subway. The station is served by lifts, and between 10 July 2006 and 14 June 2007 it was closed to allow essential refurbishment work on these and other parts of the station. There is also a staircase which can be used which has 96 steps.

Nearby points of interest are Regent's Park itself, the Royal Academy of Music, the Royal College of Physicians, Holy Trinity Church, Portland Place and Harley Street.

Great Portland Street station is within walking distance to the east for interchanges to the Circle, Hammersmith & City, and Metropolitan lines.

Services
The typical service pattern in trains per hour (tph) operated during off-peak hours weekdays and all day Saturdays is:
 6tph to Harrow & Wealdstone via Queen's Park and Stonebridge Park (Northbound)
 3tph to Stonebridge Park via Queen's Park (Northbound)
 11tph to Queen's Park (Northbound)
 20tph to Elephant & Castle (Southbound)
Weekday peak service operates with one or two additional Queen's Park-Elephant & Castle trains per hour, and Sunday service operates with two fewer Queen's Park-Elephant & Castle trains per hour during the core of the day.

Connections
The station is served by London Buses routes 18, 27, 30, 88, 205, 453 and night route N18.

Notes and references
Footnotes

Citations

External links

 London Transport Museum Photographic Archive
 
 

Bakerloo line stations
Tube stations in the City of Westminster
Former Baker Street and Waterloo Railway stations
Railway stations in Great Britain opened in 1906
Regent's Park